Love's Secret Domain is the third studio album by the British experimental band Coil, released in 1991. The singles released from the album were "Windowpane" and "The Snow". Guest vocalists include Marc Almond on the song "Titan Arch" and Annie Anxiety on the song "Things Happen".

Background
The recording sessions for Love's Secret Domain were characterized by Coil's compulsive drug use at the time, along with sleep deprivation which apparently led to conflict between members; Peter Christopherson remarked that '[he could] remember Balance and Steve having these mad arguments that would go on for 48 hours without sleep over which sequence of words should be used'. In a period of constant drug use during the sessions, they both struggled with using the studio mixing room due to constant hallucinations of '10 foot tall Amazonian warriors and Babylonian kings' who were 'crowding' the room. Stephen Thrower admitted he had experienced synchronized hallucinations with Balance during this period.

The album's emphasis on sampling was inspired by the acid house scene, although it is less explicitly indebted to the dance style than the contemporaneous work of Psychic TV.

The cover features a painting by Steven Stapleton originally created on an outhouse door that he found in Cooloorta, most known as his hometown.

A working title for the album was The Side Effects of Life.

The final track, "Love's Secret Domain", borrows lyrics from the song "In Dreams" by Roy Orbison: "In dreams I walk with you / In dreams I talk to you / In dreams you're mine / All the time." Lyrics are also culled from "The Sick Rose" by William Blake, specifically, "O rose, thou art sick", besides a quotation from Arthur Machen's short story The White People.

Love's Secret Domain was later remastered by Thighpaulsandra with slightly different track lengths. The album is currently available for purchasing in AAC, MP3, and FLAC formats at Coil's official website.

The song "Disco Hospital" was covered by Matmos on their EP California Rhinoplasty.

Track listing

12" vinyl

CD

Personnel
Credits adapted from the liner notes of Love's Secret Domain.

Additional musicians
 Charles Hayward – drums 
 Annie Anxiety Bandez – vocals 
 Mike McEvoy – keyboards 
 Juan Ramirez – spanish guitar 
 Cyrung – didgeridoo 
 Rose McDowall – backing vocals 
 Marc Almond – vocals 
 Billy McGee – orchestra 
 Audrey Riley – cello 
 Jane Fenton – cello 
 Julia Girdwood – oboe 
 Jos Pook – viola 
 Sue Dench – viola 
 Andrew Davies – violin 
 Clive Dobbins – violin 
 Gini Ball – violin 
 Sally Herbert – violin

Technical personnel
 Coil – production
 Danny Hyde – produced, production, programming, engineering

References

External links
 
 
 Love's Secret Domain at Brainwashed

1991 albums
Coil (band) albums
Experimental music albums